The Brotherhood of the Spirit (renamed Renaissance Community in 1974) was one of the largest and most enduring communes in the northeast United States and as such was a distinct link between the commune phenomenon of the 1960s and the current New Age movement. In existence from 1968 through 1988, its rise and fall mirrored that of its charismatic and mercurial leader, Michael "Rapunzel" Metelica.  The Brotherhood of the Spirit underwent several distinct identity changes during its 20-year history.

The Brotherhood of the Spirit: 1968–1973 

Michael Metelica was born in 1950 and grew up in the small rural town of Leyden, Massachusetts. At age 16, he dropped out of high school and after reading an article about the Hells Angels motorcycle gang, moved to California to join them. Repelled by their violent nature, he was instead drawn to the 1967 Summer of Love but returned to Leyden the following year. In May 1968, he asked a local blueberry farmer named Donnie Herron if he could build a treehouse on his land, and after receiving permission, lived there in solitary meditation, working for farmers for free and expecting nothing in return.

In search of answers for his spiritual experiences, Metelica consulted Beth St. Clair, a psychologist, and her cousin Charles Hapgood, a professor at Keene State College, New Hampshire and author of "Earth's Shifting Crust" the foreword of which was written by Albert Einstein. They in turn introduced him to a farmer named Elwood Babbitt, a trance-medium in the Edgar Cayce tradition. These people believed that the Earth was about to undergo cataclysmic changes in preparation of the Aquarian Age. Babbitt, in particular, said he was getting information through his spirit guides who warned that humanity's selfish and self-destructive behavior would cause nature to literally rebel in such a way as to cause widespread death and destruction. These “Earth Changes” as they were called would be a precursor to the spiritual enlightenment of the Aquarian Age, supposedly the next step in the evolution of the human race.

Metelica became something of a local sensation and attracted his first following from among his boyhood friends. After the treehouse was destroyed in late 1968 by suspicious locals, Metelica and his little band wandered around the many hill towns in the area, gaining more members, teaching their view of spirituality at area churches and schools until by early 1970, they numbered around 50. Rules were mandated banning drugs, cigarettes, alcohol and sexual promiscuity and members practiced to purge themselves of their imperfections through meditation and intense encounter-group confrontation tactics. By then, Metelica knew that he had the makings of a deliberate community that was based on spiritual beliefs and practice. According to Babbitt, groups like the Brotherhood would be the harbingers of a New Age, functioning as teachers of this higher wisdom to the shattered survivors of these worldwide cataclysms.

In March 1970, The Brotherhood purchased a 25-acre property in Warwick, Massachusetts and the group underwent the first of its many radical transformations. Their growth coincided with a counter-cultural migration as millions of young Americans, disenchanted with the “establishment” during the Vietnam War era, dropped out of universities and cities en masse and hit the road that summer looking for new venues. The membership skyrocketed to 150 leading to the acquisition of an additional house in nearby Northfield, Massachusetts, the building of a dormitory in Warwick and more stringent membership rules. Metelica became less involved with the commune, devoting most of his energy to the commune's band Spirit in Flesh, whose mission was to bring about the message of spirituality through the medium of rock and roll. In late 1970, Spirit in Flesh signed a contract with Metromedia records and the commune's focus began to shift into a full-time promotion of the band.

Veterans of the Brotherhood of the Spirit consider the Warwick era as being the closest to their ideal of a spiritual community composed of independently inspired individuals. Their youthful enthusiasm allowed them to overcome the many hardships created by an insulated environment dedicated to personal growth and spiritual reflection. For the many that came from urban backgrounds, Warwick introduced the realities of self-sufficiency through logging, house building, the cultivating and canning of homegrown food, and the ability to enjoy life without the distractions of mainstream media. Their spiritual belief system was based on aspects of Buddhism and New Age thinking mixed with an enlightened, almost Gnostic form of Christianity. Reincarnation, meditation, and the power of positive thought were considered to be major doctrines.

The years 1971–1972 were spent in frenzied activities surrounding Spirit in Flesh, including the printing of several thousand silk-screened posters that were placed all across the United States and even into parts of Europe. Because of the sluggish support from the record label, the commune devised its own guerilla tactics to promote the band which included marches in New York City, mass telephone call-ins to Metromedia, and infiltrating popular national TV talk shows to announce the band's impending success. These tactics culminated in a concert at Carnegie Hall, which was sparsely attended. The first album, which featured the entire membership of the Brotherhood commune on its cover, sold less than 1,000 copies.

The Brotherhood had developed into an efficient entity aside from promotional activities for the band. An elaborate infrastructure including business management, child care, auto maintenance, farming and food production was created. New members signed over all their money and possessions, making a "lifetime commitment" to the commune. Controversy arose due to Brotherhood members being briefly on welfare while Metelica was gifted with a Rolls-Royce. There were also numerous run-ins with local selectmen about building code violations concerning the commune's houses and septic systems. By late 1972, with membership at nearly 300, the commune's first public businesses were launched. A magazine, Free Spirit Press, was sold along the East Coast from a rainbow-painted school bus. Also in late 1972, the commune bought the Shea Theater block in Turners Falls, Massachusetts a decaying working-class village of Montague, adjacent to the city of Greenfield. Metelica issued an order that all members must find jobs outside the commune. By now, the Brotherhood of the Spirit had been mentioned in the Wall Street Journal, Look, Family Circle, and Mademoiselle magazines. They had also been featured on 60 Minutes and the David Frost show.

The Metelica Aquarian Concept and Renaissance Community: 1973–1976

In 1973, the commune went through its most drastic and traumatic change, morphing into what became known as the Metelica Aquarian Concept. Metelica shifted his focus from his band (renamed Metelica) to take absolute control over the running of the commune. He demanded that every cent earned by commune members be turned over to him whereby he then spent the money to radically reshape the appearance of the group. A shopping spree ensued that purchased 35 new cars (the tiny Honda 600 which got 50 mpg), three GMC motor homes and an airplane, plus several movie, video and still cameras. Metelica's aim was to replace the image of ragged commune hippies with that of media-savvy entrepreneurs who would change the mainstream society by mimicking its need for image and materiality. This shift in focus caused some long-term members to leave as well as causing a more negative reaction from the local community. Metelica's demand for complete power caused a cult-like mentality to permeate the group which was divided into a distinct hierarchy with him as the unquestioned and undisputed leader. The nadir of this period was the murder of a commune member while hitch-hiking from work, a crime which was never solved and the subsequent “Metelica Marches” whereby members vigiled on the streets of Turners Falls and Greenfield with signs proclaiming Metelica as a new religion. The Shea Theater complex in Turners Falls became the nerve center of the group while the Warwick property slowly fell into decline. It was during this time that Metelica's drug and alcohol addictions began which would have dire consequences for the group in the near future.

In 1974, the commune became the legally recognized and tax-exempt Renaissance Church and Renaissance Community; Metelica changed his name to Rapunzel (although few of his former adherents currently refer to him as such.) All community properties (which now included several residences in Turners Falls) were lavishly renovated while members worked a variety of jobs in the outside world.

One of these work experiences occurred at the Belchertown State School which housed close to a thousand developmentally disabled people of various ages and infirmities. Conditions at the school were described by one observer as "barbaric" and "medieval." Due to a lawsuit in 1973, the school was mandated to hire one hundred additional employees. Commune member Larry Raffel arranged for fifty of his communal peers to be hired and to work in each building on the grounds. Their care and consideration helped transform Belchertown State School into a more humane institution. During the three years of their tenure at the school, commune members helped release over a hundred residents from locked wards and into the mainstream community.

The first of many business and creative ventures were launched during this time while Metelica worked full-time in the Shea Theater's recording studio with various bands. Meetings in which Rapunzel discussed his philosophy and worldview at length were held in the theater complex. The Renaissance Church, meanwhile, opened its Sunday services to the general public featuring music and meditations with an accommodating spiritual philosophy. It also sponsored a free Christmas dinner in the Shea Theater for the next few years, which was fully attended and reportedly popular with the outside population.

By 1975, Renaissance operated a dozen businesses downtown. These reportedly included a 24-hour grocery, Cucumber Grocery, Dan Pritchet Audio, a record store,  and a stylized pizza parlor, Zapmia Pizza. The Noble Feast restaurant featured diversely innovative cuisine. Rocket's Silver Train provided luxury-modeled tour buses for rock musicians including the Rolling Stones and Linda Ronstadt. Silver Screen Design and Renaissance Greeting Cards were founded at this time. These businesses used start-up funds from working Renaissance members and two went to become successful national enterprises. These were coupled with contracting crews specializing in high-level industrial and residential painting, paving and excavating, carpentry and plumbing. The recording studio, video lab, darkroom and media equipment were made freely available to members to engage in creative enterprises. The Choir, an all-women chorus, was created at this time and performed both at church services and at outside concerts. A "Renaissance Radio Show" was syndicated nationally. Outreach to the local community was made through a series of free public events culminating in a Renaissance Faire street festival (not associated with the better-known Renaissance Pleasure Faire of Southern California) that attracted about 3,000.

The community was popular with young people from Turners Falls, who sought employment in Renaissance businesses or simply hung out in the "drop-in center". Members claim that Renaissance revitalized Turners Falls without government grants or taxpayer money. While Metelica was still a central figure, devotion to him was giving way to a growing sense of personal autonomy as members practiced a variety of new skills and acquired leadership abilities of their own.

The 2001 Center in Gill: 1975–1988 

At the end of 1975, the Renaissance Community purchased the rural Olde Stone Lodge in Gill, Massachusetts and began constructing another self-sufficient community utilizing alternative energy and sustainable technologies. Again, the group radically changed its identity as the focus shifted away from the Turners Falls businesses (most of which closed) to the building of innovatively designed houses on the 80-acre Gill property, nicknamed the "2001 Center."

During this time, the community began networking with other spiritual communities; especially Findhorn in Scotland, whose leaders and members exchanged visits with those of Renaissance. There was also a huge increase of children. These were later said by members to be the most relaxed and harmonious years since the beginning. At the 1976 May Day rock concert, 14,000 people descended on Gill, but otherwise the community got on well with the town.

Although the financial policies regarding commune members was gradually liberalized, the dispute concerning Metelica's leadership role divided the community into two hostile groups culminating in the decision by the card company to separate from the community and re-establish itself in southern Maine. A large segment of core members departed. By the mid-1980s the population of the community was drastically reduced to about 70 adult members with an equal number of children.

For the next few years, this remnant continued to build their houses and maintain the land in Gill despite the departure of other long-term members and the influx of new ones, some of whom were violent or otherwise dysfunctional. Rapunzel's increasingly erratic behavior caused another rebellion against his authority in 1984, this time centered around the silkscreen company. This led to a final migration of vital members from which Renaissance never recovered.

Meanwhile, reunions and newsletters of former members signaled a shift in focus toward those who had left and were trying to process the communal experience for themselves. From 1984 until 1988, the community, now down to its final dozen members, struggled to maintain some semblance of cohesion as group meetings and projects ended and the land itself began to deteriorate. In 1988, the remaining community leadership offered Metelica $10,000 to leave and never return. He accepted and moved to upstate New York for the remainder of his life.

The Aftermath: 1988–2003 

In 1988, the Renaissance Community as a recognizable communal entity came to an end.  The Gill property was cleaned up and cooperatively managed. The various houses were sold off to private ownership and the Olde Stone Lodge house was renovated into separate apartments. Several successful contracting businesses based in Gill still exist, along with regular seminars dealing with meditation and spiritual practice. Former and current members attend reunions and discuss the community's controversial legacy. Former members have gone on to become teachers, artists, health-care providers, millionaire executives, and at least one ordained Buddhist monk. In May 2006, former member Bruce Geisler produced a documentary film about the community entitled Free Spirits: The Birth, Life and Loss of a New Age Dream.

Michael Metelica lived out the remainder of his life in the Hudson River valley in upstate New York. There he was licensed as an EMT, attended Alcoholics Anonymous to treat his many addictions, and entered therapy for bipolar disorder. He was diagnosed with terminal colon cancer in May 2002. The following month a gathering occurred at the home of his long-time friend and mentor, Beth St. Clair, and was attended by his children, and several of his former followers. He died in February 2003 in Cairo, New York.

References

External links 

1970 establishments in Massachusetts
1988 disestablishments in the United States
Intentional communities in the United States
Warwick, Massachusetts